Ian Foster may refer to:
 Ian Foster (computer scientist) (born 1959), New Zealand–American computer scientist
 Ian Foster (footballer) (born 1976), English football player and coach
 Ian Foster (musician) (born 1981), Canadian singer-songwriter, producer and filmmaker
 Ian Foster (rugby union) (born 1965), New Zealand rugby union player and coach